Hadley's Rebellion is a 1983 American drama film directed by Fred Walton.

Plot
A small town youngster's passion for authentic wrestling is not matched by those around him at a California prep school.

Cast
 Griffin O'Neal as Hadley Hickman 
 William Devane as Coach Ball 
 Charles Durning as Sam Crawford
Adam Baldwin as Bobo McKenzie
Lisa Lucas as Linda Johnson
Eric Boles as Mr. Stevens
Chad McQueen as Rick Stanton

References

External links

1983 films
1983 drama films
American drama films
American high school films
Films directed by Fred Walton (director)
Sport wrestling films
1980s English-language films
1980s American films
English-language drama films